Geeta Janardan Sane (Devanagari: गीता जनार्दन साने) (1907–1991) was a feminist writer from Maharashtra, India.

Early life
Sane was born in Amravati. Her father was a teacher who   later trained to be a lawyer. Both parents of Sane were progressive in their thinking. They conducted their daughters' weddings without any religious rituals. The weddings "must have cost a rupee and a half, each," Sane once said.

Among students studying at Nagpur University in her days, Sane was the first female to receive a bachelor's degree in the faculty of Science. Before her, females at that university, just like at most other universities in India in those times, studied liberal arts. After graduation, she taught mathematics.

Progressive ideas
In her college days, Sane was influenced by Marxism.

In 1927, while she was in college, a Muslim male student with the last name Khan and a Hindu female student with the last name Panandikar got married, and there was a furor, expressed by conservatives especially in the then-influential Marathi daily Pune Waibhawa (पुणें वैभव), about the interfaith marriage. Sane wrote her angry progressive response to the conservative furor.

As a feminist, she advocated a matriarchial system. She retained her last name Sane after marrying at age 26 a lawyer named Narasimha Dhagamwar, and advanced the same name retention idea for other women. She advocated that married women in Maharashtra do away with the strong social custom of their placing on their foreheads a kuṅkūṃ dot and wearing a mangalsootra as symbols of their holy matrimonial state.

Husband and daughter
In the late 1920s, Sane's future husband Dhagamwar had been an active participant in the Indian freedom movement, and the then British government ruling over India had charged him with participation in the 1929 Meerat conspiracy.

Sane's daughter Vasudha Dhagamwar has a law degree, and is a journalist and a civil liberties activist.

Authorship
Bharatiya Stree Jeewan (भारतीय स्त्रीजीवन) (1985) is a nonfictional work by Sane.

The following are some of her novels, most of which develop feminist themes.

 Nikhalati Hirakani (निखळती हिरकणी) (1935)
 Wathalela Wruksha (वठलेला वृक्ष) (1936)
 Hirawalikhali (हिरवळीखाली) (1936)
 Avishkar (आविष्कार) (1939) 
 Pheriwala (फेरीवाला) (1939)
 Dhuke Ani Dahi.nwar (धुके आणि दहिंवर) (1942)
 Deepastambha (दीपस्तम्भ) (1950)

References

Sources
 https://books.google.com/books?id=u297RJP9gvwC&pg=PA446
 https://books.google.com/books?id=sqBjpV9OzcsC&pg=PA347

1991 deaths
1907 births
Indian feminist writers
Women writers from Maharashtra
Marathi-language writers
20th-century Indian women writers
20th-century Indian writers
People from Amravati district